Rock Spirits is the manufacturing division of the Newfoundland and Labrador Liquor Corporation, a provincial crown corporation of the Canadian province of Newfoundland and Labrador. It is the only remaining Canadian Liquor Board to have a manufacturing division. It has been in operation in St. John's for over 65 years.

Rock Spirits ships products to all the Canadian Liquor Boards, across the United States and over 30 countries in 4 continents, with production of almost 400 000 cases a year on 5 packaging lines.

Rock Spirits owns 15 of its own brands, including its iconic Screech Rum.  Some of the partner brands bottled at Rock Spirits include Crystal Head Vodka, Iceberg Vodka, Golden Wedding and Liquormen’s Ol’ Dirty Canadian Whisky.

References

External links
Rock Spirits
Newfoundland and Labrador Liquor Corporation
Agencies, Boards and Commissions - Government of Newfoundland

Alcohol in Newfoundland and Labrador
Crown corporations of Newfoundland and Labrador
Canadian provincial alcohol departments and agencies
Companies based in St. John's, Newfoundland and Labrador
Alcohol monopolies
Distilleries in Canada
Alcohol distribution retailers of Canada